The Corner Brook Royals are a senior ice hockey team based in Corner Brook, Newfoundland and Labrador and a member of the Central West Senior Hockey League. Corner Brook has been associated with Newfoundland senior hockey since March 1935 when their picked team of league all-stars won the first all-Newfoundland championship and, in December of that year, became a member of the western division of the Newfoundland Amateur Hockey Association.

Table key

NAHA Western Division (1935-1953)

NAHA = Newfoundland Amateur Hockey Association

Notes (1935–1953)
Since 1927, prior to the founding of the Newfoundland Amateur Hockey Association (NAHA) in December 1935, picked teams from Corner Brook were playing exhibition games and a number of intertown series' with teams from other hockey centres. From 1935-36 to the end of the 1952-53 season, Corner Brook was a member of the Western Division of the Newfoundland Senior League. There were no regular seasons during this period.  The all-stars played a series of exhibition games and then competed in a pre-determined playoff format to decide the western champions who would advance to the all-Newfoundland Herder finals against the Eastern champions.

NAHA Section B (1953-1959)

NAHA-B = Newfoundland Amateur Hockey Association Section B

NAHA Section A (1958-1959)

NAHA-A = Newfoundland Amateur Hockey Association Section A

Notes (1953-1959)
Corner Brook didn't enter NAHA playoffs during 1953-1955. From 1955-56 to 1958-59, they entered a team in Section "B" where teams could not have imports (paid players) on their rosters. With no regular seasons during this period, the all-stars/Royals played a series of exhibition games and then competed in the Section B playoffs for the Evening Telegram Trophy. The Corner Brook Royals entered a section "A" team in the Herder playoffs in 1958 and 1959.

NAHA Western Division (1959-1962)

NAHA = Newfoundland Amateur Hockey Association

Notes (1959-1962)
From 1959-60 to 1961-62, the Corner Brook Royals were a member of NAHA's Western Division. There were a series of exhibition game followed by a round robin Herder western semi-finals. The top team after the semi-finals played the Eastern round robin champion in a Herder finals series.

NSHL (1962-1983)

NSHL = Newfoundland Senior Hockey League

WCSHL (1996-2011)

Note: GP = Games played, W = Wins, L = Losses, T = Ties, OTL = Overtime Losses, Pts = Points, GF = Goals for, GA = Goals againstWCSHL = West Coast Senior Hockey LeagueNSHL/CWSHL (2012-present)NSHL = Newfoundland Senior Hockey League, CWSHL = Central West Senior Hockey LeagueWCSHL (2017-present)WCSHL = West Coast Senior Hockey League''

References

Bibliography

Ice hockey in Newfoundland and Labrador
Ice hockey teams in Newfoundland and Labrador
Royals seasons
Newfoundland and Labrador sport-related lists
Canadian ice hockey-related lists